Frank Carroll may refer to:
Frank Carroll (figure skater) (born 1939), American figure skating coach
Frank Carroll (ice hockey) (1879–1938), Canadian ice hockey coach
Frank Carroll (Queensland politician) (born 1952), Australian politician
Frank Skeffington Carroll (c. 1837–1887), fraudster, editor, and (briefly) politician in South Australia
Frank Carroll (Arizona politician), member of the Arizona House of Representatives